Ottowia flava is a Gram-negative, short-rod-shaped and non-motile bacterium from the genus Ottowia which has been isolated from the intestine a of fish from the Maowei Sea in China.

References

Comamonadaceae
Bacteria described in 2020